The 57th Annual Grammy Awards were held on February 8, 2015, at the Staples Center in Los Angeles, California. The show was broadcast live by CBS at 5:00 p.m. PST (UTC−8). Rapper LL Cool J hosted the show for the fourth consecutive time.

The Grammy nominations were open for recordings released between October 1, 2013, and September 30, 2014. Breaking from tradition of a prime-time concert approach, the Grammy nominees were announced during an all-day event on December 5, 2014, starting with initial announcements on the CBS This Morning telecast, followed by updates made through The Grammys' official Twitter account.

Sam Smith won four awards, including Best New Artist, Record of the Year, Song of the Year for "Stay with Me" and Best Pop Vocal Album for In the Lonely Hour. Beck's album Morning Phase was named Album of the Year. This prompted Kanye West, who later said he thought Beyoncé should have won, to jokingly leap onstage to interrupt Beck in a re-enactment of his 2009 MTV VMA scandal, but West left the stage without saying anything. Both Pharrell Williams and Beyoncé took three honors; with her wins, Beyoncé became the second-most-honored female musician in Grammy history following Alison Krauss. Lifetime Achievement awards were given to the Bee Gees, George Harrison, Pierre Boulez, Buddy Guy, and Flaco Jiménez.

In all, 83 Grammy Awards were presented, one more than in 2014.

The show aired simultaneously on Fox8 in Australia, Sky TV in New Zealand, and on Channel O in South Africa.

Pre-telecast ceremony 

Not all Grammys were presented during the live telecast. As in previous years, most awards were handed out during the so-called pre-telecast ceremony, held at the Nokia Theater next to the Staples Center, which takes place during the afternoon before the main show. From 2015 on, this ceremony has been known as the Premiere Ceremony. Approximately 70 Grammys were presented at this ceremony, consisting of the "minor" categories.

Performers 

During the ceremony, United States President Barack Obama delivered a pre-recorded message in which he spoke about domestic violence against women. His message was followed by a plea from domestic violence advocate Brooke Axtell and singer Katy Perry performing her ballad "By the Grace of God" as a dedication to the victims of the crime.

Presenters 

 Taylor Swift – presented Best New Artist, introducing Sam Smith and Mary J. Blige
 Anna Kendrick – introduced Ariana Grande
 Jessie J and Tom Jones – presented Best Pop Solo Performance
 Dierks Bentley – introduced Miranda Lambert
 Pentatonix and Barry Gibb – presented Best Pop Vocal Album
 Miley Cyrus and Nicki Minaj – introduced Madonna
 Josh Duhamel, Julian Edelman, and Malcolm Butler – presented Best Rock Album
 Smokey Robinson and Nile Rodgers – presented Grammy Award for Best R&B Performance
 James Corden – introduced Ed Sheeran and John Mayer
 Ryan Seacrest  – introduced Adam Levine and Gwen Stefani
 Meghan Trainor and Nick Jonas – presented Best Country Album
 The Weeknd – introduced Pharrell Williams and Lang Lang
 Katharine McPhee – introduced Lady Gaga and Tony Bennett
 Keith Urban – introduced Eric Church
 Gina Rodriguez – introduced Juanes
 Prince – presented Album of the Year
 Shia LaBeouf – introduced Sia
 Enrique Iglesias – presented Song of the Year
 Dave Grohl – introduced Beck and Chris Martin
 Jamie Foxx and Stevie Wonder presented Record of the Year
 Gwyneth Paltrow – introduced Beyoncé

Winners and nominees 

The eligibility period for the 57th Annual Grammy Awards was October 1, 2013, to September 30, 2014. The nominees were announced on December 5, 2014. The Album of the Year nominees were announced during A Very Grammy Christmas, which was broadcast on the same day.

General 

Record of the Year
 "Stay with Me" (Darkchild Version) – Sam Smith
 Steve Fitzmaurice, Rodney Jerkins and Jimmy Napes, producers; Steve Fitzmaurice, Jimmy Napes and Steve Price, engineers/mixers; Tom Coyne, mastering engineer
 "Fancy" – Iggy Azalea featuring Charli XCX
 The Arcade and The Invisible Men, producers; Anthony Kilhofler and Eric Weaver, engineers/mixers; Miles Showell, mastering engineer
 "Chandelier" – Sia
 Greg Kurstin and Jesse Shatkin, producers; Greg Kurstin, Manny Marroquin and Jesse Shatkin, engineers/mixers; Emily Lazar, mastering engineer
 "Shake It Off" – Taylor Swift
 Max Martin and Shellback, producers; Serban Ghenea, John Hanes, Sam Holland and Michael Ilbert, engineers/mixers; Tom Coyne, mastering engineer
 "All About That Bass" – Meghan Trainor
 Kevin Kadish, producer; Kevin Kadish, engineer/mixer; Dave Kutch, mastering engineer

Album of the Year
Morning Phase – Beck Beck Hansen, producer; Tom Elmhirst, David Greenbaum, Florian Lagatta, Cole Marsden Greif-Neill, Robbie Nelson, Darrell Thorp, Cassidy Turbin and Joe Visciano, engineers/mixers; Bob Ludwig, mastering engineer In the Lonely Hour – Sam Smith
 Steve Fitzmaurice, Komi, Howard Lawrence, Zane Lowe, Mojam, Jimmy Napes, Naughty Boy, Fraser T Smith, Two Inch Punch and Eg White, producers; Michael Angelo, Graham Archer, Steve Fitzmaurice, Simon Hale, Darren Heelis, James Murray, Jimmy Napes, Mustafa Omer, Dan Parry, Steve Price and Eg White, engineers/mixers; Tom Coyne and Stuart Hawkes, mastering engineers
 Beyoncé – Beyoncé
 Chimamanda Ngozi Adichie, Drake, Jay Z and Frank Ocean, featured artists; Ammo, Boots, Noel "Detail" Fisher, Jerome Harmon, Hit-Boy, Beyoncé Knowles, Terius "The Dream" Nash, Caroline Polachek, Rey Reel, Noah "40" Shebib, Ryan Tedder, Timbaland, Justin Timberlake, Key Wane and Pharrell Williams, producers; Boots, Noel Cadastre, Noel "Gadget" Campbell, Rob Cohen, Andrew Coleman, Chris Godbey, Justin Hergett, James Krausse, Mike Larson, Jonathan Lee, Tony Maserati, Ann Mincieli, Caroline Polachek, Andrew Scheps, Bart Schoudel, Noah "40" Shebib, Ryan Tedder, Stuart White and Jordan "DJ Swivel" Young, engineers/mixers; Tom Coyne, James Krausse and Aya Merrill, mastering engineers
 x – Ed Sheeran
 Jeff Bhasker, Benny Blanco, Jake Gosling, Johnny McDaid, Rick Rubin and Pharrell Williams, producers; Andrew Coleman, Jake Gosling, Matty Green, William Hicks, Tyler Sam Johnson, Jason Lader, Johnny McDaid, Chris Scafani, Mark Stent and Geoff Swan, engineers/mixers; Stuart Hawkes, mastering engineer
 G I R L – Pharrell Williams
 Alicia Keys and Justin Timberlake, featured artists; Pharrell Williams, producer; Leslie Brathwaite, Adrian Breakspear, Andrew Coleman, Jimmy Douglas, Hart Gunther, Mick Guzauski, Florian Lagatta, Mike Larson, Stephanie McNally, Alan Meyerson, Ann Mincieli and Kenta Yonesaka, engineers/mixers; Bob Ludwig, mastering engineerSong of the Year "Stay with Me" (Darkchild Version) James Napier, William Phillips and Sam Smith, songwriters (Sam Smith)  "All About That Bass"
 Kevin Kadish and Meghan Trainor, songwriters (Meghan Trainor)
 "Chandelier"
 Sia Furler and Jesse Shatkin, songwriters (Sia)
 "Shake It Off"
 Max Martin, Shellback and Taylor Swift, songwriters (Taylor Swift)
 "Take Me to Church"
 Andrew Hozier-Byrne, songwriter (Hozier)Best New Artist Sam Smith Iggy Azalea
 Bastille
 Brandy Clark
 HAIM

 Pop Best Pop Solo Performance "Happy (Live)" – Pharrell Williams "All of Me (Live)" – John Legend
 "Stay With Me (Darkchild Version)" – Sam Smith
 "Chandelier" – Sia
 "Shake It Off" – Taylor SwiftBest Pop Duo/Group Performance "Say Something" – A Great Big World and Christina Aguilera "Fancy" – Iggy Azalea featuring Charli XCX
 "A Sky Full of Stars" – Coldplay
 "Bang Bang" – Jessie J, Ariana Grande, and Nicki Minaj
 "Dark Horse" – Katy Perry featuring Juicy JBest Pop Vocal Album In the Lonely Hour – Sam Smith
 Ghost Stories – Coldplay
 Bangerz – Miley Cyrus
 My Everything – Ariana Grande
 Prism – Katy Perry
 x – Ed Sheeran

Best Traditional Pop Vocal Album
 Cheek to Cheek – Tony Bennett and Lady Gaga Nostalgia – Annie Lennox
 Night Songs – Barry Manilow
 Sending You a Little Christmas – Johnny Mathis
 Partners – Barbra Streisand

 Dance/Electronic Best Dance Recording "Rather Be" – Clean Bandit featuring Jess Glynne Grace Chatto and Jack Patterson, producers; Wez Clarke and Jack Patterson, mixers "Never Say Never" – Basement Jaxx featuring ETML
 Basement Jaxx, producers; Basement Jaxx, mixers
 "F For You" – Disclosure featuring Mary J. Blige
 Disclosure, producer; Disclosure, mixer
 "I Got U" – Duke Dumont featuring Jax Jones
 Duke Dumont and Jax Jones, producers; Tommy Forrest, mixer
 "Faded" – Zhu
 Zhu, producer; Zhu, mixerBest Dance/Electronic Album Syro – Aphex Twin while(1<2) – deadmau5
 Nabuma Rubberband – Little Dragon
 Do It Again – Röyksopp and Robyn
 Damage Control – Mat Zo

 Contemporary Instrumental Best Contemporary Instrumental Album Bass & Mandolin – Chris Thile and Edgar Meyer Wild Heart – Mindi Abair
 Slam Dunk – Gerald Albright
 Nathan East – Nathan East
 Jazz Funk Soul – Jeff Lorber, Chuck Loeb and Everette Harp

 Rock Best Rock Performance "Lazaretto" – Jack White "Gimme Something Good" – Ryan Adams
 "Do I Wanna Know?" – Arctic Monkeys
 "Blue Moon" – Beck
 "Fever" – The Black KeysBest Metal Performance "The Last in Line" – Tenacious D "Neon Knights" – Anthrax
 "High Road" – Mastodon
 "Heartbreaker" – Motörhead
 "The Negative One" – SlipknotBest Rock Song "Ain't It Fun" Hayley Williams and Taylor York, songwriters (Paramore) "Blue Moon"
 Beck Hansen, songwriter (Beck)
 "Fever"
 Dan Auerbach, Patrick Carney and Brian Burton, songwriters (The Black Keys)
 "Gimme Something Good"
 Ryan Adams, songwriter (Ryan Adams)
 "Lazaretto"
 Jack White, songwriter (Jack White)Best Rock Album Morning Phase – Beck Ryan Adams – Ryan Adams
 Turn Blue – The Black Keys
 Hypnotic Eye – Tom Petty and the Heartbreakers
 Songs of Innocence – U2

 Alternative Best Alternative Music Album St. Vincent – St. Vincent This Is All Yours – alt-J
 Reflektor – Arcade Fire
 Melophobia – Cage the Elephant
 Lazaretto – Jack White

 R&B Best R&B Performance  "Drunk in Love" – Beyoncé featuring Jay Z "New Flame" – Chris Brown featuring Usher and Rick Ross
 "It's Your World" – Jennifer Hudson featuring R. Kelly
 "Like This" – Ledisi
 "Good Kisser" – UsherBest Traditional R&B Performance "Jesus Children" – Robert Glasper Experiment featuring Lalah Hathaway and Malcolm Jamal Warner "As" – Marsha Ambrosius and Anthony Hamilton
 "I.R.S" – Angie Fisher
 "Nobody" – Kem
 "Hold Up Wait a Minute (Woo Woo)" – Antonique SmithBest R&B Song "Drunk in Love" Shawn Carter, Rasool Diaz, Noel Fisher, Jerome Harmon, Beyoncé Knowles, Timothy Mosely, Andre Eric Proctor and Brian Soko, songwriters (Beyoncé featuring Jay Z) "Good Kisser"
 Ronald "Flip" Colson, Warren "Oak" Felder, Usher Raymond IV, Jameel Roberts, Terry "Tru" Sneed and Andrew "Pop" Wansel, songwriters (Usher)
 "New Flame"
 Eric Bellinger, Chris Brown, James Chambers, Malissa Hunter, Justin Booth Johnson, Mark Pitts, Usher Raymond IV, William Roberts, Maurice "Verse" Simmonds and Keith Thomas, songwriters (Chris Brown featuring Usher and Rick Ross)
 "Options (Wolfjames Version)"
 Dominic Gordon, Brandon Hesson and Jamaica "Kahn-Cept" Smith, songwriters (Luke James)
 "The Worst"
 Jhené Aiko Chilombo, Mac Robinson and Brian Warfield, songwriter (Jhené Aiko)Best Urban Contemporary Album G I R L – Pharrell Williams Sail Out – Jhené Aiko
 Beyoncé – Beyoncé
 X –  Chris Brown
 Mali is... – Mali MusicBest R&B Album Love, Marriage & Divorce – Toni Braxton and Babyface Islander – Bernhoft
 Lift Your Spirit – Aloe Blacc
 Black Radio 2 – Robert Glasper Experiment
 Give The People What They Want – Sharon Jones and The Dap-Kings

 Rap Best Rap Performance "i" – Kendrick Lamar "3005" – Childish Gambino
 "0 to 100 / The Catch Up" – Drake
 "Rap God" – Eminem
 "All I Need Is You" – LecraeBest Rap/Sung Collaboration "The Monster" – Eminem featuring Rihanna "Blak Majik" – Common featuring Jhené Aiko
 "Tuesday" – ILoveMakonnen featuring Drake
 "Studio" – Schoolboy Q featuring BJ the Chicago Kid
 "Bound 2" – Kanye West featuring Charlie WilsonBest Rap Song "i" Kendrick Duckworth and Columbus Smith III, songwriters (Kendrick Lamar) "Anaconda"
 Ernest Clark, Jamal Jones, Onika Maraj, Marcos Palacios and Jonathan Solone-Myvett, Anthony Ray songwriters (Nicki Minaj)
 "Bound 2"
 Mike Dean, Malik Jones, Che Pope, Elon Rutberg, Sakiya Sandifer, John Stephens, Kanye West, Charlie Wilson and Cydel Young, songwriters (Kanye West featuring Charlie Wilson)
 "We Dem Boyz"
 Noel Fisher and Cameron Thomaz, songwriters (Wiz Khalifa)
 "0 to 100 / The Catch Up"
 A. Feeney, Aubrey Graham, Anderson Hernandez, P. Jefferies, Matthew Samuels and Noah Shebib, songwriters (Drake)Best Rap Album The Marshall Mathers LP 2 – Eminem The New Classic – Iggy Azalea
 Because the Internet – Childish Gambino
 Nobody's Smiling – Common
 Oxymoron – ScHoolboy Q
 Blacc Hollywood – Wiz Khalifa

 Country Best Country Solo Performance "Something in the Water" – Carrie Underwood "Give Me Back My Hometown" – Eric Church
 "Invisible" – Hunter Hayes
 "Automatic" – Miranda Lambert
 "Cop Car" – Keith UrbanBest Country Duo/Group Performance "Gentle on My Mind" – The Band Perry "Somethin' Bad" – Miranda Lambert with Carrie Underwood
 "Day Drinking" – Little Big Town
 "Meanwhile Back at Mama's – Tim McGraw featuring Faith Hill
 "Raise 'Em Up" – Keith Urban featuring Eric ChurchBest Country Song "I'm Not Gonna Miss You" Glen Campbell and Julian Raymond, songwriters (Glen Campbell) "American Kids"
 Rodney Clawson, Luke Laird and Shane McAnally, songwriters (Kenny Chesney)
 "Automatic"
 Nicolle Galyon, Natalie Hemby and Miranda Lambert, songwriters (Miranda Lambert)
 "Give Me Back My Hometown"
 Eric Church and Luke Laird, songwriters (Eric Church)
 "Meanwhile Back at Mama's"
 Tom Douglas, Jaren Johnston and Jeffrey Steele, songwriters (Tim McGraw featuring Faith Hill)Best Country Album Platinum – Miranda Lambert Riser – Dierks Bentley
 The Outsiders – Eric Church
 12 Stories – Brandy Clark
 The Way I'm Livin' – Lee Ann Womack

 New Age Best New Age Album Winds of Samsara – Ricky Kej and Wouter Kellerman Bhakti – Paul Avgerinos
 Ritual – Peter Kater and R. Carlos Nakai
 Symphony Live in Istanbul – Kitaro
 In Love and Longing – Silvia Nakkach and David Darling

 Jazz Best Improvised Jazz Solo "Fingerprints" – Chick Corea, soloist "The Eye of the Hurricane" – Kenny Barron, soloist
 "You and the Night and the Music" – Fred Hersch, soloist
 "Recorda Me" – Joe Lovano, soloist
 "Sleeping Giant" – Brad Mehldau, soloistBest Jazz Vocal Album Beautiful Life – Dianne Reeves Map to the Treasure: Reimagining Laura Nyro – Billy Childs and various artists
 I Wanna Be Evil – René Marie
 Live in NYC – Gretchen Parlato
 Paris Sessions – Tierney SuttonBest Jazz Instrumental Album Trilogy – Chick Corea Trio Landmarks – Brian Blade and the Fellowship Band
 Floating – Fred Hersch Trio
 Enjoy the View – Bobby Hutcherson, David Sanborn, Joey DeFrancesco featuring Billy Hart
 All Rise: A Joyful Elegy for Fats Waller – Jason MoranBest Large Jazz Ensemble Album Life in the Bubble – Gordon Goodwin's Big Phat Band The L.A. Treasures Project – Clayton-Hamilton Jazz Orchestra
 Quiet Pride: The Elizabeth Catlett Project – Rufus Reid
 Live: I Hear the Sound – Archie Shepp Attica Blues Orchestra
 OverTime: Music of Bob Brookmeyer – Vanguard Jazz OrchestraBest Latin Jazz Album The Offense of the Drum – Arturo O'Farrill and the Afro Latin Jazz Orchestra The Latin Side of Joe Henderson – Conrad Herwig featuring Joe Lovano
 The Pedrito Martinez Group – Pedrito Martinez Group
 Second Half – Emilio Solla y la Inestable de Brooklyn
 New Throned King – Yosvany Terry

 Gospel/Contemporary Christian Best Gospel Performance/Song "No Greater Love" – Smokie Norful Aaron W. Lindsey, Smokie Norful, songwriters "Help" – Erica Campbell featuring Lecrae
 Erica Campbell, Warryn Campbell, Hasben Jones, Harold Lilly, Lecrae Moore, Aaron Sledge, songwriters
 "Sunday A.M. (Live)" – Karen Clark Sheard
 Rudy Currence, Donald Lawrence, songwriters
 "I Believe" – Mali Music
 Kortney J. Pollard, songwriter
 "Love on the Radio" – The Walls Group
 "In the Raw" – Tehrah
 Kirk Franklin, songwriterBest Contemporary Christian Music Performance/Song "Messengers" – Lecrae featuring For King & Country Torrance Esmond, Ran Jackson, Ricky Jackson, Kenneth Chris Mackey, Lecrae Moore, Joseph Prielozny, Joel Smallbone, Luke Smallbone, songwriters "Write Your Story" – Francesca Battistelli
 Francesca Battistelli, David Arthur Garcia, Ben Glover, songwriters
 "Come as You Are" – Crowder
 David Crowder, Ben Glover and Matt Maher, songwriters
 "Shake" – MercyMe
 Nathan Cochran, David Arthur Garcia, Ben Glover, Barry Graul, Bart Millard, Soli Olds, Mike Scheuchzer, Robby Shaffer, songwriters
 "Multiplied" – Needtobreathe
 Bear Rinehart, Bo Rinehart, songwritersBest Gospel Album Help – Erica Campbell Amazing (Live) – Ricky Dillard and New G
 Withholding Nothing (Live) – William McDowell
 Forever Yours – Smokie Norful
 Vintage Worship – Anita WilsonBest Contemporary Christian Music Album Run Wild. Live Free. Love Strong. – For King & Country If We're Honest – Francesca Battistelli
 Hurricane – Natalie Grant
 Welcome to the New – MercyMe
 Royal Tailor – Royal TailorBest Roots Gospel Album Shine for All the People – Mike Farris Forever Changed – T. Graham Brown
 Hymns – Gaither Vocal Band
 A Cappella – The Martins
 His Way of Loving Me – Tim Menzies

 Latin Best Latin Pop Album Tangos – Rubén Blades Elypse – Camila
 Raíz – Lila Downs, Niña Pastori and Soledad
 Loco de Amor – Juanes
 Gracias Por Estar Aquí – Marco Antonio SolísBest Latin Rock Urban or Alternative Album Multi Viral – Calle 13 Behind The Machine (Detrás De La Máquina) – ChocQuibTown
 Bailar en la Cueva – Jorge Drexler
 Agua Maldita – Molotov
 Vengo – Ana TijouxBest Regional Mexican Music Album (Including Tejano) Mano A Mano – Tangos A La Manera De Vicente Fernández – Vicente Fernández Lastima Que Sean Ajenas – Pepe Aguilar
 Voz Y Guitarra – Ixya Herrera
 15 Aniversario – Mariachi Divas de Cindy Shea
 Alegría Del Mariachi – Mariachi Los Arrieros Del ValleBest Tropical Latin Album Más + Corazón Profundo – Carlos Vives 50 Aniversario – El Gran Combo de Puerto Rico
 First Class To Havana – Aymée Nuviola
 Live – Palo!
 El Asunto – Totó La Momposina

 Americana Music Best American Roots Performance "A Feather's Not a Bird" – Rosanne Cash "Statesboro Blues" – Gregg Allman and Taj Mahal
 "And When I Die" – Billy Childs featuring Alison Krauss and Jerry Douglas
 "The Old Me Better" – Keb' Mo' featuring the California Feet Warmers
 "Destination" – Nickel CreekBest American Roots Song "A Feather's Not a Bird" – Rosanne Cash and John Leventhal, songwriters (Rosanne Cash) "Just So Much" – Jesse Winchester, songwriter (Jesse Winchester)
 "The New York Trains" – Woody Guthrie and Del McCoury, songwriters (Del McCoury Band)
 "Pretty Little One" – Edie Brickell and Steve Martin, songwriters (Steve Martin and the Steep Canyon Rangers featuring Edie Brickell)
 "Terms of My Surrender" – John Hiatt, songwriter (John Hiatt)Best Americana Album The River & the Thread – Rosanne Cash Terms of My Surrender – John Hiatt
 BluesAmericana – Keb' Mo'
 A Dotted Line – Nickel Creek
 Metamodern Sounds in Country Music – Sturgill SimpsonBest Bluegrass Album The Earls of Leicester – The Earls of Leicester Noam Pikelny Plays Kenny Baker Plays Bill Monroe – Noam Pikelny
 Cold Spell – Frank Solivan and Dirty Kitchen
 Into My Own – Bryan Sutton
 Only Me – Rhonda VincentBest Blues Album Step Back – Johnny Winter Common Ground: Dave Alvin & Phil Alvin Play and Sing the Songs of Big Bill Broonzy – Dave Alvin and Phil Alvin
 Promise of a Brand New Day – Ruthie Foster
 Juke Joint Chapel – Charlie Musselwhite
 Decisions – Bobby Rush with Blinddog Smokin'Best Folk Album Remedy – Old Crow Medicine Show Three Bells – Mike Auldridge, Jerry Douglas, Rob Ickes
 Follow the Music – Alice Gerrard
 The Nocturne Diaries – Eliza Gilkyson
 A Reasonable Amount of Trouble – Jesse WinchesterBest Regional Music Album The Legacy  – Jo-El Sonnier Light the Stars – Bonsoir, Catin
 Hanu 'A'ala – Kamaka Kukona
 Love's Lies – Magnolia Sisters
 Ceremony – Joe Tohonnie Jr.

 Reggae Best Reggae Album Fly Rasta – Ziggy Marley  Back on the Controls – Lee "Scratch" Perry
 Full Frequency – Sean Paul
 Out of Many, One Music – Shaggy
 Reggae Power – Sly and Robbie and Spicy Chocolate
 Amid the Noise and the Haste – SOJA

 World Music Best World Music Album Eve – Angélique Kidjo Toumani & Sidiki – Toumani Diabaté and Sidiki Diabaté
 Our World in Song – Wu Man, Luis Conte and Daniel Ho
 Magic – Sérgio Mendes
 Traces of You – Anoushka Shankar

 Children's Best Children's Album I Am Malala: How One Girl Stood Up For Education And Changed The World (Malala Yousafzai) – Neela Vaswani Appetite For Construction – The Pop Ups
 Just Say Hi! – Brady Rymer and the Little Band That Could
 The Perfect Quirk – Secret Agent 23 Skidoo
 Through The Woods – The Okee Dokee Brothers

 Spoken Word Best Spoken Word Album (Includes Poetry, Audio Books and Story Telling) Diary of a Mad Diva – Joan Rivers Actors Anonymous – James Franco
 A Call to Action – Jimmy Carter
 Carsick: John Waters Hitchhikes Across America – John Waters
 A Fighting Chance – Elizabeth Warren
 We Will Survive: True Stories of Encouragement, Inspiration, and the Power of Song – Gloria Gaynor

 Comedy Best Comedy Album Mandatory Fun – "Weird Al" Yankovic Obsessed – Jim Gaffigan
 Oh My God – Louis C.K.
 Tragedy Plus Comedy Equals Time – Patton Oswalt
 We Are Miracles – Sarah Silverman

 Musical Show Best Musical Theater Album Beautiful: The Carole King Musical – Jessie Mueller, principal soloist; Jason Howland, Steve Sidwell and Billy Jay Stein, producers (Carole King, composer and lyricist) (original Broadway cast) Aladdin – James Monroe Iglehart, Adam Jacobs and Courtney Reed, principal soloists; Frank Filipetti, Michael Kosarin, Alan Menken and Chris Montan, producers (Alan Menken, composer; Howard Ashman, Chad Beguelin and Tim Rice, lyricists) (original Broadway cast)
 A Gentleman's Guide to Love and Murder – Jefferson Mays and Bryce Pinkham, principal soloists; Kurt Deutsch and Joel Moss, producers; Robert L. Freedman, lyricist; Steven Lutvak, composer and lyricist (original Broadway cast)
 Hedwig and the Angry Inch – Lena Hall and Neil Patrick Harris, principal soloists; Justin Craig, Tim O'Heir and Stephen Trask, producers (Stephen Trask, composer and lyricist) (original Broadway cast)
 West Side Story – Cheyenne Jackson and Alexandra Silber, principal soloists; Jack Vad, producer (Leonard Bernstein, composer; Stephen Sondheim, lyricist) (Cheyenne Jackson and Alexandra Silber with the San Francisco Symphony)

 Music for Visual Media Best Compilation Soundtrack for Visual Media Frozen – various artists American Hustle – various artists
 Get on Up: The James Brown Story – James Brown
 Guardians of the Galaxy: Awesome Mix Vol. 1 – various artists
 The Wolf of Wall Street – various artistsBest Score Soundtrack for Visual Media The Grand Budapest Hotel: Original Soundtrack – Alexandre Desplat, composer Frozen – Christophe Beck, composer
 Gone Girl: Soundtrack from the Motion Picture – Trent Reznor and Atticus Ross, composers
 Gravity: Original Motion Picture Soundtrack – Steven Price, composer
 Saving Mr. Banks – Thomas Newman, composerBest Song Written for Visual Media "Let It Go" (from Frozen) – Kristen Anderson-Lopez and Robert Lopez, songwriters (Idina Menzel) "Everything Is Awesome" (from The Lego Movie) – Joshua Bartholomew, Lisa Harriton, Shawn Patterson, Andy Samberg, Akiva Schaffer and Jorma Taccone, songwriters (Tegan and Sara featuring the Lonely Island)
 "I See Fire" (from The Hobbit: The Desolation of Smaug) – Ed Sheeran, songwriter (Ed Sheeran)
 "I'm Not Gonna Miss You" (from Glen Campbell: I'll Be Me) – Glen Campbell and Julian Raymond, songwriters (Glen Campbell)
 "The Moon Song" (from Her) – Spike Jonze and Karen O, songwriters (Scarlett Johansson and Joaquin Phoenix)

 Composing/Arranging Best Instrumental Composition "The Book Thief" John Williams, composer (John Williams) "Last Train To Sanity"
 Stanley Clarke, composer (The Stanley Clarke Band)
 "Life in the Bubble"
 Gordon Goodwin, composer (Gordon Goodwin's Big Phat Band)
 "Recognition"
 Rufus Reid, composer (Rufus Reid)
 "Tarnation"
 Edgar Meyer and Chris Thile, composers (Chris Thile and Edgar Meyer)Best Arrangement, Instrumental or a Cappella "Daft Punk" Ben Bram, Mitch Grassi, Scott Hoying, Avi Kaplan, Kirstie Maldonado and Kevin Olusola, arrangers (Pentatonix) "Beautiful Dreamer"
 Pete McGuinness, arranger (The Pete McGuinness Jazz Orchestra)
 "Get Smart"
 Gordon Goodwin, arranger (Gordon Goodwin's Big Phat Band)
 "Guantanamera"
 Alfredo Rodríguez, arranger (Alfredo Rodríguez)
 "Moon River"
 Chris Walden, arranger (Amy Dickson)Best Arrangement, Instruments And Vocals "New York Tendaberry" Billy Childs, arranger (Billy Childs Featuring Renée Fleming and Yo-Yo Ma) "All My Tomorrows"
 Jeremy Fox, arranger (Jeremy Fox featuring Kate McGarry)
 "Goodnight America"
 Vince Mendoza, arranger (Mary Chapin Carpenter)
 "Party Rockers"
 Gordon Goodwin, arranger (Gordon Goodwin's Big Phat Band)
 "What Are You Doing The Rest of Your Life?"
 Pete McGuinness, arranger (The Pete McGuinness Jazz Orchestra)

 Crafts Best Recording Package Lightning Bolt
 Jeff Ament, Don Pendleton, Joe Spix and Jerome Turner, art directors (Pearl Jam)
 Formosa Medicine Show
 David Chen and Andrew Wong, art directors (The Muddy Basin Ramblers)
 Indie Cindy
 Vaughan Oliver, art director (Pixies)
 LP1
 FKA Twigs and Phil Lee, art directors (FKA twigs)
 Whispers
 Sarah Larnach, art director (Passenger)

Best Boxed or Special Limited Edition Package
 The Rise and Fall of Paramount Records, Volume One (1917–27)
 Susan Archie, Dean Blackwood and Jack White, art directors (various artists)
 Cities of Darkscorch
 Leland Meiners and Ken Shipley, art directors (various artists)
 A Letter Home (vinyl box set)
 Gary Burden and Jenice Heo, art directors (Neil Young)
 Sparks (deluxe album box set)
 Andy Carne, art director (Imogen Heap)
 Spring 1990 (The Other One)
 Jessica Dessner, Lisa Glines, Doran Tyson and Steve Vance, art directors (Grateful Dead)

Best Album Notes
 Offering: Live at Temple University
 Ashley Kahn, album notes writer (John Coltrane)
 Happy: The 1920 Rainbo Orchestra Sides
 David Sager, album notes writer (Isham Jones Rainbo Orchestra)
 I'm Just Like You: Sly's Stone Flower 1969–70
 Alec Palao, album notes writer (Various Artists)
 The Other Side Of Bakersfield: 1950s & 60s Boppers and Rockers from 'Nashville West
 Scott B. Bomar, album notes writer (Various Artists)
 Purple Snow: Forecasting the Minneapolis Sound
 Jon Kirby, album notes writer (Various Artists)
 The Rise & Fall Of Paramount Records, Volume One (1917–27)
 Scott Blackwood, album notes writer (Various Artists)

Historical 
Best Historical Album
 The Garden Spot Programs, 1950
 Colin Escott and Cheryl Pawelski, compilation producers; Michael Graves, mastering engineer (Hank Williams)
 Black Europe: The Sounds And Images Of Black People In Europe Pre-1927
 Jeffrey Green, Ranier E. Lotz and Howard Rye, compilation producers; Christian Zwarg, mastering engineer (Various Artists)
 Happy: The 1920 Rainbo Orchestra Sides
 Meagan Hennessey and Richard Martin, compilation producers; Richard Martin, mastering engineer (Isham Jones Rainbo Orchestra)
 Longing for the Past: The 78 RPM Era In Southeast Asia
 Steven Lance Ledbetter and David Murray, compilation producers; Michael Graves, mastering engineer (Various Artists)
 There's A Dream I've Been Saving: Lee Hazlewood Industries 1966 – 1971 (Deluxe Edition)
 Hunter Lea, Patrick McCarthy and Matt Sullivan, compilation producers; John Baldwin, mastering engineer (Various Artists)

Production 

Best Engineered Album, Non-Classical
 Morning Phase
 Tom Elmhirst, David Greenbaum, Florian Lagatta, Cole Marsden, Greif Neill, Robbie Nelson, Darrell Thorp, Cassidy Turbin and Joe Visciano, engineers; Bob Ludwig, mastering engineer (Beck)
 Bass & Mandolin
 Richard King and Dave Sinko, engineers; Robert C. Ludwig, mastering engineer (Chris Thile and Edgar Meyer)
 Bluesamericana
 Ross Hogarth and Casey Wasner, engineers; Richard Dodd, mastering engineer (Keb' Mo')
 The Way I'm Livin'
 Chuck Ainlay, engineer; Gavin Lurssen, mastering engineer (Lee Ann Womack)
 What's Left Is Forever
 Tchad Blake, Oyvind Jakobsen, Jo Ranheim, Itai Shapiro and David Way, engineers; Bernie Grundman, mastering engineer (Thomas Dybdahl)

Producer of the Year, Non-Classical
 Max Martin
 "Bang Bang" (Jessie J, Ariana Grande and Nicki Minaj)
 "Break Free" (Ariana Grande Featuring Zedd)
 "Dark Horse" (Katy Perry Featuring Juicy J)
 "Problem" (Ariana Grande Featuring Iggy Azalea)
 "Shake It Off" (Taylor Swift)
 "Unconditionally" (Katy Perry)
 Paul Epworth
 "Pendulum" (FKA Twigs)
 "Queenie Eye" (Paul McCartney)
 "Road" (Paul McCartney)
 "Save Us" (Paul McCartney)
 John Hill
 "All You Never Say" (Birdy)
 "Burning Gold" (Christina Perri)
 "Can't Remember to Forget You" (Shakira Featuring Rihanna)
 "Goldmine" (Kimbra)
 "Guts Over Fear" (Eminem Featuring Sia)
 Strange Desire (Bleachers)
 Voices (Phantogram)
 "Water Fountain" (Tune-Yards)
 Jay Joyce
 About Last Night (Sleeper Agent)
 It Goes Like This (Thomas Rhett)
 Melophobia (Cage the Elephant)
 Montibello Memories (Matrimony)
 Mountains of Sorrow, Rivers of Song (Amos Lee)
 The Outsiders (Eric Church)
 Greg Kurstin
 "Beating Heart" (Ellie Goulding)
 "Chandelier" (Sia)
 "Double Rainbow" (Katy Perry)
 "Gunshot" (Lykke Li)
 "Money Power Glory" (Lana Del Rey)
 1000 Forms of Fear (Sia)
 Sheezus (Lily Allen)
 Wrapped in Red (Kelly Clarkson)

Best Remixed Recording, Non-Classical
 "All of Me" (Tiësto's Birthday Treatment Remix)
 Tijs Michiel Verwest, remixer (John Legend)
 "Falling Out" (Ming Remix)
 Aaron Albano, remixer (Crossfingers Featuring Danny Losito)
 "Pompeii" (Audien Remix)
 Nathaniel Rathbun, remixer (Bastille)
 "The Rising" (Eddie Amador Remix)
 Eddie Amador, remixer (Five Knives)
 "Smile" (Kaskade Edit)
 Ryan Raddon, remixer (Galantis)
 "Waves" (Robin Schulz Remix)
 Robin Schulz, remixer (Mr Probz)

Production, Surround Sound 

Best Surround Sound Album
 Beyoncé
 Elliot Scheiner, surround mix engineer; Bob Ludwig, surround mastering engineer; Beyoncé Knowles, surround producer (Beyoncé)
 Beppe: Remote Galaxy
 Morten Lindberg, surround mix engineer; Morten Lindberg, surround mastering engineer; Morten Lindberg, surround producer (Vladimir Ashkenazy and Philharmonia Orchestra)
 Chamberland: The Berlin Remixes
 David Miles Huber, surround mix engineer; David Miles Huber, surround mastering engineer; David Miles Huber, surround producer (David Miles Huber)
 The Division Bell (20th Anniversary Deluxe Box Set)
 Damon Iddins and Andy Jackson, surround mix engineers; Damon Iddins and Andy Jackson, surround mastering engineers (Pink Floyd)
 Epics Of Love
 Hans-Jörg Maucksch, surround mix engineer; Hans-Jörg Maucksch, surround mastering engineer; Günter Pauler, surround producer (Song Zuying, Yu Long and China Philharmonic Orchestra)
 Mahler: Symphony No. 2 'Resurrection
 Michael Bishop, surround mix engineer; Michael Bishop, surround mastering engineer; Elaine Martone, surround producer (Benjamin Zander and Philharmonia Orchestra)

Production, Classical 

Best Engineered Album, Classical
 Vaughan Williams: Dona Nobis Pacem; Symphony No. 4; The Lark Ascending
 Michael Bishop, engineer; Michael Bishop, mastering engineer (Robert Spano, Norman Mackenzie, Atlanta Symphony Orchestra and Chorus)
 Adams, John: City Noir
 Richard King, engineer; Wolfgang Schiefermair, mastering engineer (David Robertson and St. Louis Symphony)
 Adams, John Luther: Become Ocean
 Dmitriy Lipay and Nathaniel Reichman, engineers; Nathaniel Reichman, mastering engineer (Ludovic Morlot and Seattle Symphony)
 Dutilleux: Symphony No. 1; Tout Un Monde Lointain; The Shadows Of Time
 Dmitriy Lipay, engineer; Dmitriy Lipay, mastering engineer (Ludovic Morlot and Seattle Symphony)
 Riccardo Muti Conducts Mason Bates and Anna Clyne
 David Frost and Christopher Willis, engineers; Tim Martyn, mastering engineer (Riccardo Muti and Chicago Symphony Orchestra)

Producer of the Year, Classical
 Judith Sherman
 Beethoven: Cello and Piano Complete (Fischer Duo) Brahms By Heart (Chiara String Quartet) Composing America (Lark Quartet) Divergence (Plattform K + K Vienna) The Good Song (Thomas Meglioranza) Mozart and Brahms: Clarinet Quintets (Anthony McGill and Pacifica Quartet) Snapshot (American Brass Quintet) Two X Four (Jaime Laredo, Jennifer Koh, Vinay Parameswaran and Curtis 20/21 Ensemble) Wagner Without Words (Llŷr Williams) Morten Lindberg
 Beppe: Remote Galaxy (Vladimir Ashkenazy and Philharmonia Orchestra)
 Dyrud: Out Of Darkness (Vivianne Sydnes and Nidaros Cathedral Choir)
 Ja, Vi Elsker (Tone Bianca Sparre Dahl, Ingar Bergby, Staff Band Of The Norwegian Armed Forces and Schola Cantorum)
 Symphonies Of Wind Instruments (Ingar Bergby & Royal Norwegian Navy Band)
 Dmitriy Lipay
 Adams, John Luther: Become Ocean (Ludovic Morlot and Seattle Symphony)
 Dutilleux: Symphony No. 1; Tout Un Monde Lointain; The Shadows of Time (Ludovic Morlot and Seattle Symphony)
 Fauré: Masques Et Bergamasques; Pelléas Et Mélisande; Dolly (Ludovic Morlot, Seattle Symphony Chorale and Seattle Symphony)
 Hindemith: Nobilissima Visione; Five Pieces For String Orchestra (Gerard Schwarz and Seattle Symphony)
 Ives: Symphony No. 2; Carter: Instances; Gershwin: An American In Paris (Ludovic Morlot and Seattle Symphony)
 Ravel: Orchestral Works; Saint-Saëns: Organ Symphony (Ludovic Morlot and Seattle Symphony)
 Elaine Martone
 Hallowed Ground (Louis Langrée, Maya Angelou, Nathan Wyatt and Cincinnati Symphony Orchestra)
 Mahler: Symphony No. 2 'Resurrection (Benjamin Zander, Stefan Bevier, Philharmonia Chorus and Orchestra)
 Sibelius: Symphonies Nos. 6 and 7; Tapiola (Robert Spano and Atlanta Symphony Orchestra)
 Vaughan Williams: Dona Nobis Pacem; Symphony No. 4; The Lark Ascending (Robert Spano, Norman Mackenzie, Atlanta Symphony Orchestra and Chorus)
 David Starobin
 All The Things You Are (Leon Fleisher)
 Complete Crumb Edition, Vol. 16 (Ann Crumb, Patrick Mason, James Freeman and Orchestra 2001)
 Game of Attrition – Arlene Sierra, Vol. 2 (Jac Van Steen and BBC National Orchestra of Wales)
 Haydn, Beethoven and Schubert (Gilbert Kalish)
 Mozart: Piano Concertos, No. 12, K. 414 and No. 23, K. 488 (Marianna Shirinyan, Scott Yoo and Odense Symphony Orchestra)
 Music Of Peter Lieberson, Vol. 3 (Scott Yoo, Roberto Diaz, Steven Beck and Odense Symphony Orchestra)
 Rochberg, Chihara and Rorem (Jerome Lowenthal)
 Tchaikovsky: The Tempest, Op. 18 and Piano Concerto No. 1, Op. 23 (Joyce Yang, Alexander Lazarev and Odense Symphony Orchestra)

 Classical Best Orchestral Performance Adams, John: City Noir
 David Robertson, (St. Louis Symphony)
 Dutilleux: Symphony No. 1; Tout un monde lointain...; The Shadows of Time
 Ludovic Morlot, conductor (Seattle Symphony)
 Dvořák: Symphony No. 8; Janacek: Symphonic Suite From Jenůfa
 Manfred Honeck, conductor (Pittsburgh Symphony Orchestra)
 Schumann: Symphonien 1–4
 Simon Rattle, conductor (Berliner Philharmoniker)
 Sibelius: Symphonies Nos. 6 and 7; Tapiola
 Robert Spano, conductor (Atlanta Symphony Orchestra)

Best Opera Recording
 Charpentier: La descente d'Orphée aux enfers
 Paul O'Dette and Stephen Stubbs, conductors; Aaron Sheehan; Renate Wolter-Seevers, producer (Boston Early Music Festival Chamber Ensemble; Boston Early Music Festival Vocal Ensemble)
 Milhaud: L'Orestie d'Eschyle
 Kenneth Kiesler, conductor; Dan Kempson, Jennifer Lane, Tamara Mumford and Brenda Rae; Tim Handley, producer (University of Michigan Percussion Ensemble and University of Michigan Symphony Orchestra; University of Michigan Chamber Choir, University of Michigan Orpheus Singers, University of Michigan University Choir and UMS Choral Union)
 Rameau: Hippolyte et Aricie
 William Christie, conductor; Sarah Connolly, Stéphane Degout, Christiane Karg, Ed Lyon and Katherine Watson; Sébastien Chonion, producer (Orchestra of the Age of Enlightenment; The Glyndebourne Chorus)
 Schönberg: Moses und Aron
 Sylvain Cambreling, conductor; Andreas Conrad and Franz Grundheber; Reinhard Oechsler, producer (SWR Sinfonieorchester Baden-Baden und Freiburg; EuropaChorAkademie)
 Strauss: Elektra
 Christian Thielemann, conductor; Evelyn Herlitzius, Waltraud Meier, René Pape and Anne Schwanewilms; Magdalena Herbst, producer (Staatskapelle Dresden; Sächsischer Staatsopernchor Dresden)

Best Choral Performance

Performers who are not eligible for an award (such as orchestras, soloists or choirs) are mentioned in parentheses

 The Sacred Spirit of Russia
 Craig Hella Johnson, conductor (Conspirare)
 Bach: Matthäus-Passion
 René Jacobs, conductor (Werner Güra and Johannes Weisser; Akademie Für Alte Musik Berlin; Rias Kammerchor and Staats-Und Domchor Berlin)
 Dyrud: Out of Darkness
 Vivianne Sydnes, conductor (Erlend Aagaard Nilsen and Geir Morten Øien; Sarah Head and Lars Sitter; Nidaros Cathedral Choir)
 Holst: First Choral Symphony; The Mystic Trumpeter
 Andrew Davis; Stephen Jackson, chorus master (Susan Gritton; BBC Symphony Orchestra; BBC Symphony Chorus)
 Mozart: Requiem Mass in D minor
 John Butt, conductor (Matthew Brook, Rowan Hellier, Thomas Hobbs and Joanne Lunn; Dunedin Consort)

Best Chamber Music/Small Ensemble Performance
 In 27 Pieces – The Hilary Hahn Encores
 Hilary Hahn and Cory Smythe
 Dreams and Prayers
 David Krakauer and A Far Cry
 Martinů: Cello Sonatas Nos. 1–3
 Steven Isserlis and Olli Mustonen
 Partch: Castor and Pollux
 Partch
 Sing Thee Nowell
 New York Polyphony

Best Classical Instrumental Solo
 Play
 Jason Vieaux
 All The Things You Are
 Leon Fleisher
 The Carnegie Recital
 Daniil Trifonov
 Dutilleux: Tout un monde lointain...
 Xavier Phillips; Ludovic Morlot, conductor (Seattle Symphony)
 Toccatas
 Jory Vinikour

Best Classical Solo Vocal Album
 Douce France
 Anne Sofie Von Otter; Bengt Forsberg, accompanist (Carl Bagge, Margareta Bengston, Mats Bergström, Per Ekdahl, Bengan Janson, Olle Linder and Antoine Tamestit)
 Porpora: Arias
 Philippe Jaroussky; Andrea Marcon, conductor (Cecilia Bartoli; Venice Baroque Orchestra)
 Schubert: Die Schöne Müllerin
 Florian Boesch; Malcolm Martineau, accompanist
 Stella Di Napoli
 Joyce DiDonato; Riccardo Minasi, conductor (Chœur De L'Opéra National De Lyon; Orchestre De L'Opéra National De Lyon)
 Virtuoso Rossini Arias
 Lawrence Brownlee; Constantine Orbelian, conductor (Kaunas City Symphony Orchestra)

Best Classical Compendium
 Partch: Plectra and Percussion Dances
 Partch; John Schneider, producer
 Britten To America
 Jeffrey Skidmore, conductor; Colin Matthews, producer
 Mieczysław Weinberg
 Giedrė Dirvanauskaitė, Daniil Grishin, Gidon Kremer and Daniil Trifonov; Manfred Eicher, producer
 Mike Marshall and The Turtle Island Quartet
 Mike Marshall (musician) and Turtle Island Quartet; Mike Marshall, producer
 The Solent – Fifty Years of Music By Ralph Vaughan Williams
 Paul Daniel, conductor; Andrew Walton, producer

Best Contemporary Classical Composition
 Adams, John Luther: Become Ocean
 John Luther Adams, composer (Ludovic Morlot and Seattle Symphony)
 Clyne, Anna: Prince of Clouds
 Anna Clyne, composer (Jaime Laredo, Jennifer Koh, Vinay Parameswaran and Curtis 20/21 Ensemble)
 Crumb, George: Voices From The Heartland
 George Crumb, composer (Ann Crumb, Patrick Mason, James Freeman and Orchestra 2001)
 Paulus, Stephen: Concerto for Two Trumpets and Band
 Stephen Paulus, composer (Eric Berlin, Richard Kelley, James Patrick Miller and UMASS Wind Ensemble)
 Sierra, Roberto: Sinfonía No. 4
 Roberto Sierra, composer (Giancarlo Guerrero and Nashville Symphony)

Music Video/Film 

Best Music Video
 "Happy" – Pharrell Williams
 We Are From LA, video director; Kathleen Heffernan, Solal Micenmacher, Jett Steiger and Cedric Troadec, video producers
 "We Exist" – Arcade Fire
 David Wilson, video director; Sue Yeon Ahn and Jason Baum, video producers
 "Turn Down for What" – DJ Snake and Lil Jon
 Daniel Kwan and Daniel Scheinert, video directors; Judy Craig, Jonathan Wang, Candance Ouaknine and Bryan Younce, video producers
 "Chandelier" – Sia
 Sia Furler and Daniel Askill, video directors; Jennifer Heath and Jack Hogan, video producers
 "The Golden Age" – Woodkid featuring Max Richter
 Yoann Lemoine, video director; Kathleen Heffernan, Roman Pichon Herrera, Christine Miller and Annabel Rosier, video producers

Best Music Film
 20 Feet from Stardom – Darlene Love, Merry Clayton, Lisa Fischer and Judith Hill
 Morgan Neville, video director; Gil Friesen and Caitrin Rogers, video producers
 On The Run Tour: Beyoncé and Jay-Z (TV Program)
 Jonas Åkerlund, video director; Ed Burke, Svana Gisla and Dan Parise, video producers
 Ghost Stories – Coldplay
 Paul Dugdale, video director; Jim Parsons, video producer
 "Metallica Through the Never" – Metallica
 Nimród Antal, video director; Adam Ellison and Charlotte Huggins, video producers
 The Truth About Love Tour: Live from Melbourne – Pink
 Larn Poland, video director; Roger Davies, video producer

Special Merit Awards

MusiCares Person of the Year

 Bob Dylan

Lifetime Achievement Award

 Bee Gees
 Pierre Boulez
 Buddy Guy
 George Harrison
 Maria Cordero
 Flaco Jiménez
 The Louvin Brothers
 Wayne Shorter

Trustees Award

 Barry Mann and Cynthia Weil
 Richard Perry
 George Wein

Technical Grammy Award

 Raymond Kurzweil

Music Educator Award
 Jared Cassedy (of Windham High School in Windham, New Hampshire)

Grammy Hall of Fame inductions

In Memoriam 

 Joe Cocker
 Andraé Crouch
 Pete Seeger
 Jack Bruce
 Johnny Winter
 Bobby Keys
 Ian McLagan
 Tommy Ramone
 Jimmy Ruffin
 Wayne Henderson
 Joe Sample
 Bobby Womack
 Don Covay
 Jesse Winchester
 Robin Williams
 Little Jimmy Dickens
 Jimmy C. Newman
 George Hamilton IV
 Bob Montgomery
 Horace Silver
 Charlie Haden
 Buddy DeFranco
 Paul Horn
 Big Bank Hank
 Frankie Knuckles
 Steven "Asap Yams" Rodriguez
 Casey Kasem
 Gerry Goffin
 Bob Crewe
 Paul Revere
 Bob Casale
 Kim Fowley
 Paco de Lucía
 Gustavo Cerati
 Cheo Feliciano
 Lorin Maazel
 Stephen Paulus
 Ann Ruckert
 Mike Nichols
 Ruby Dee
 Ted Bergmann
 Cosimo Matassa
 Gary Haber
 David Anderle
 Peter Grosslight
 Peter Shukat
 Rod McKuen
 Dallas Taylor
 Tim Hauser
 Maya Angelou

Multiple nominations and awards 

The following received multiple nominations:

Six:

 Beyoncé
 Sam Smith
 Pharrell Williams

Five:

 Bob Ludwig

Four:

 Iggy Azalea
 Beck
 Eric Church
 Tom Coyne
 Drake
 Gordon Goodwin
 Jay-Z
 Miranda Lambert
 Sia
 Usher
 Jack White

Three:

 Ryan Adams
 Jhené Aiko
 The Black Keys
 Chris Brown
 Rosanne Cash
 Billy Childs
 Coldplay
 Tehrah

 Andrew Coleman
 Detail
 Eminem
 Ben Glover
 Florian Lagatta
 Lecrae

 Dmitriy Lipay
 Max Martin
 Rick Ross
 Ed Sheeran
 Taylor Swift

Two:

 Arcade Fire
 Francesca Battistelli
 Michael Bishop
 Glen Campbell
 Charli XCX
 Brandy Clark
 Common
 Chick Corea
 Jerry Douglas
 Tom Elmhirst
 Steve Fitzmaurice
 For King & Country
 Childish Gambino
 Ariana Grande
 Michael Graves
 David Greenbaum
 Cole M. Greif-Neill
 Stuart Hawkes

 Fred Hersch
 John Hiatt
 J-Roc
 Keb' Mo'
 Kevin Kadish
 Wiz Khalifa
 Richard King
 Greg Kurstin
 Luke Laird
 Kendrick Lamar
 Mike Larson
 Howard Lawrence
 John Legend
 Morten Lindberg
 Kristen Anderson-Lopez
 Robert Lopez
 Joe Lovano
 Mali Music

 Elaine Martone
 Pete McGuinness
 MercyMe
 Edgar Meyer
 Ann Mincieli
 Nicki Minaj
 Ludovic Morlot
 Jimmy Napes
 Robbie Nelson
 Nickel Creek
 Smokie Norful
 Partch
 Katy Perry
 Tom Petty
 Steve Price
 Julian Raymond
 Rufus Reid
 Robert Glasper Experiment

 Schoolboy Q
 Jesse Shatkin
 Noah "40" Shebib
 Shellback
 Chris Thile
 Darrell Thorp
 Timbaland
 Justin Timberlake
 Meghan Trainor
 Daniil Trifonov
 Cassidy Turbin
 Carrie Underwood
 Keith Urban
 Joe Visciano
 Kanye West
 Charlie Wilson
 Jesse Winchester

The following received multiple awards:

Four:

 Sam Smith

Three:

 Beyoncé
 Rosanne Cash
 Bob Ludwig
 Pharrell Williams

Two:

 Beck
 Chick Corea
 Tom Elmhirst
 Eminem
 For King & Country
 David Greenbaum
 Cole M. Greif-Neill
 Jay-Z
 Florian Lagatta
 Kendrick Lamar
 Kristen Anderson-Lopez
 Robert Lopez
 Jimmy Napes
 Robbie Nelson
 Darrell Thorp
 Cassidy Turbin
 Joe Visciano
 Jack White

Changes 
As usual, had a number of small changes in the voting and awarding process:
 New categories
The Best American Roots Performance is a new category in the American Roots genre field. It was presented to the creators of the best performance in this genre field, which includes traditional Northern American (or regional roots) musical styles such as cajun, zydeco, polka and others.
Another new category is the Best Roots Gospel Album in the Gospel genre field, for gospel albums in the aforementioned musical styles, including traditional southern Gospel music.
 Changes in the Gospel categories
The Gospel genre field was redefined to make a clearer distinction between the traditional gospel music and the style known as Contemporary Christian Music (CCM). As mentioned above, the Best Roots Gospel Album category is new. The categories in the Gospel field will now be known as Best Gospel Performance/Song, Best Contemporary Christian Music Performance/Song, Best Gospel Album, Best Contemporary Christian Music Album and Best Roots Gospel Album.
 Samples allowed
For the first time, the use of samples and/or interpolations of other works in a new track was permitted in the various songwriters categories. Until now, samples were only allowed in the Best Rap Song category, but these are now also eligible in the Song of the Year, Best Rock Song, Best R&B Song, Best Country Song, Best Gospel Performance/Song, Best Contemporary Christian Music Performance/Song, Best American Roots Song and Best Song Written For Visual Media categories.
 A few minor name changes.

See also 

 21st Screen Actors Guild Awards
 35th Golden Raspberry Awards
 87th Academy Awards
 67th Primetime Emmy Awards
 68th British Academy Film Awards
 69th Tony Awards
 72nd Golden Globe Awards

Notes 

 Tom Petty and Jeff Lynne, writers of the song "I Won't Back Down" (1989) and credited co-writers of "Stay with Me", were given special award certificates by the National Academy of Recording Arts and Sciences in place of a Grammy Award for Song of the Year.

References

External links 
 

2015 in Los Angeles
 057
2015 music awards
2015 in American music
Grammy
February 2015 events in the United States